The Bostonians is a novel by Henry James, first published as a serial in The Century Magazine in 1885–1886 and then as a book in 1886. This bittersweet tragicomedy centres on an odd triangle of characters: Basil Ransom, a political conservative from Mississippi; Olive Chancellor, Ransom's cousin and a Boston feminist; and Verena Tarrant, a pretty, young protégée of Olive's in the feminist movement. The storyline concerns the struggle between Ransom and Olive for Verena's allegiance and affection, though the novel also includes a wide panorama of political activists, newspaper people, and quirky eccentrics.

Publication
Henry James originally entered into an agreement with the Boston publisher  James R. Osgood & Co. to publish the book in the United States for $4,000. Osgood made a separate agreement with The Century for the magazine to serialize the novel. In May 1885, before the serialization had finished and James had been paid any of the money owed to him, Osgood's firm went bankrupt. James was able to recover part of the lost sum by selling the copyright to Macmillan and Co., which published The Bostonians in a three-volume edition in Britain in February 1886, and in a one-volume edition in the US in May 1886. James was not, however, able to recover any money for the serialization in The Century.

Plot summary
Mississippi lawyer and Civil War veteran, Basil Ransom, visits his cousin Olive Chancellor in Boston. She takes him to a political meeting where Verena Tarrant delivers a feminist speech. Ransom, a strong conservative, is annoyed by the speech but fascinated with the speaker. Olive, who has never before set eyes on Verena, is equally fascinated. She persuades Verena to leave her parents' house, move in with her and study in preparation for a career in the feminist movement. Meanwhile, Ransom returns to his law practice in New York, which is not doing well. He visits Boston again and walks with Verena through the Harvard College grounds, including the impressive Civil War Memorial Hall. Verena finds herself attracted to the charismatic Ransom.

Basil eventually proposes to Verena, much to Olive's dismay. Olive has arranged for Verena to speak at the Boston Music Hall. Ransom shows up at the hall just before Verena is scheduled to begin her speech. He persuades Verena to elope with him, to the discomfiture of Olive and her fellow-feminists. The final sentence of the novel shows Verena in tears – not to be her last, James assures us.

Themes

Unlike much of James' work, The Bostonians deals with explicitly political themes: feminism and the general role of women in society. James was at best ambivalent about the feminist movement, and the early chapters harshly satirise Olive and her fellow ideologues. Another theme in the book, much discussed recently, is Olive's possible lesbian attraction to Verena. (The term Boston marriage came to connote just such an ambiguous co-habiting long-term relationship between two women.) James is not explicit here, partially due to the conventions of the time. But this vagueness—because it creates possible ambiguity about Olive's motives—may, or may not, enrich the novel.

People divide over how to read the book. To some, as Ransom gets closer to winning Verena, he seems to lose at least some of his creator's sympathy; to others, none at all. To some, he becomes more sympathetic to Olive in the later chapters as she begins to lose Verena; to others, he merely observes her suffering. Some think her painful recognition of her situation somewhat similar to Isabel Archer's long nighttime meditation in chapter 42 of The Portrait of a Lady; others don't.

The three central characters are surrounded by a vivid supporting cast of would-be reformers, cynical journalists, and sometimes sinister hangers-on.

The title refers, not to the people of Boston in general, but to the two characters Olive and Verena, "as they appeared to the mind of Ransom, the southerner, and outsider, looking at them from New York."

Critical evaluation
The Bostonians was not well received by contemporary critics, especially in north America. James himself once wrote an observation that The Bostonians had never, "even to my much-disciplined patience, received any sort of justice." James' portrayal of Boston reformers was denounced as inaccurate and unfair, especially because some felt James had satirised actual persons in the novel. Darrel Abel observes that when the novel was first published in Century Magazine in 1885, the people of Boston were very displeased:

The Bostonians resented its satire upon their intellectual and humanitary aspirations. They resented the author's evident sympathy with his reactionary Southern hero – a sympathy perhaps partly picked up from the British, who admired the Southern gentleman more than the Yankee reformer. The Bostonians considered Miss Birdseye an insulting caricature of Miss Elizabeth Peabody, the sister-in-law of Hawthorne, associate of Alcott, and friend of Emerson, and therefore too sacrosanct a personage to be placed in a humorous light. But probably most offensive to Boston propriety were the unmistakable indications of Lesbianism in the portrait of Olive Chancellor, which made it a violation of Boston decency and reticence.

Horace Scudder reviewed the book in 1886, calling it an unfair treatment of characters whom the author simply did not like, although James had a definite interest in them:

When we say that most of the characters are repellent, we are simply recording the effect which they produce upon the reader by reason of the attitude which the author of their being takes toward them. He does not love them. Why should he ask more of us? But since he is extremely interested in them, and seems never wearied of setting them in every possible light, we also accede to this interest, and if we have time enough strike up an extraordinary intimacy with all parties. It is when this interest leads Mr. James to push his characters too near the brink of nature that we step back and decline to follow.

Mark Twain vowed that he would rather be damned to John Bunyan's heaven than read the book. The letter in which Twain wrote this remark also contains invectives against the works of George Eliot and Nathaniel Hawthorne. Albert Bigelow Paine wrote in his annotation, "It is as easy to understand Mark Twain's enjoyment of Indian Summer as his revolt against Daniel Deronda and The Bostonians. He cared little for writing that did not convey its purpose in the simplest and most direct terms."

Rebecca West described the book, in her biography of Henry James, as "a foolish song set to a good tune in the way it fails to 'come off.'" She praised the book's language and themes, but thought the book's political content was strained and unnecessary; she believed that James, by emphasising the political aspects of the subject matter, had inadvertently distracted the reader from what he actually had set out to say: "The pioneers who wanted to raise the small silvery song of art had to tempt their audiences somehow from the big brass band of America's political movements."

Some later critics, though uncomfortable with what they think the novel's rather static nature and perhaps excessive length, have found more to praise in James' account of the contest for Verena and his description of the wider background of feminism and other reform movements. Edmund Wilson wrote in 1938, in his book The Triple Thinkers: Ten Essays on Literature, "The first hundred pages of The Bostonians, with the arrival of the young Southerner in Boston and his first contacts with the Boston reformers, is, in its way, one of the most masterly things that Henry James ever did." The quiet but significant struggle between Olive Chancellor and Basil Ransom does seem more pertinent and engrossing today than it might have appeared to 19th century readers, because it records the struggles of a historical period that has had, we can now see, a profound impact upon the kind of country America has become.

F. R. Leavis praised the book as "one of the two most brilliant novels in the language," the other being James's The Portrait of a Lady. Leavis described it as "wonderfully rich, intelligent and brilliant . . . It could have been written only by James, and it has an overt richness of life such as is not commonly associated with him."

James bemoaned the adverse effect that this novel and The Princess Casamassima (published in the same year) had on his critical fortunes. Although he didn't turn away from political themes completely, he never again gave political ideas such a prominent place in his fiction.

According to Henry James' 'Notebooks', the "initial idea" of 'The Bostonians' came from Alphonse Daudet's novel The Evangelist, also about an evangelical older woman who draws a young woman under her sway to serve her cause (religion, rather than suffrage).

Film version
The Bostonians was filmed in 1984 by the Merchant Ivory team (director James Ivory, producer Ismail Merchant, writer Ruth Prawer Jhabvala) with Christopher Reeve, Vanessa Redgrave and Madeleine Potter in the three central roles.

The movie earned mixed reviews, with a 60% "fresh" rating on Rotten Tomatoes. Vanessa Redgrave's performance received high marks, however, as well as nominations for the 1984 Golden Globe and Academy Award for Best Actress. Further, the movie earned other award nominations for costume design and cinematography.

The 2005 independent drama film The Californians is an updated adaptation of the story.

Cultural references
 A young Olive Chancellor appears as a character in The League of Extraordinary Gentlemen. Due to her feminist beliefs, the young Olive met a sadly humiliating fate in this universe, her cameo displays that she was sent to the 'Correctional Academy for Wayward Gentlewoman', and is spanked with a cane across her bare bottom by the harsh teacher Ms.Katy Carr as another student held Olive down, promising to beat the 'independent american' out of her, Olive is simply left to plead for mercy.

See also

 Boston marriage
 Misogyny

References

 A Henry James Encyclopedia by Robert Gale (New York: Greenwood Press, 1989) 
 The Novels of Henry James by Edward Wagenknecht (New York: Frederick Ungar Publishing Co., 1983)

External links

 Volume I and Volume II at Project Gutenberg
 Original magazine publication of The Bostonians (1885–86)
 First book version of The Bostonians (1886)
 Note on the various texts of The Bostonians at the Library of America web site
 IMDb page for the movie version of The Bostonians (1984)
 

American novels adapted into films
1886 British novels
1886 American novels
Novels set in Boston
Novels by Henry James
Novels first published in serial form
Films set in Boston
Works originally published in The Century Magazine
British novels adapted into films